Singapore Standard may refer to:
 Singapore Standard (regulatory policy), the standards used for industrial activities in Singapore
 Singapore Standard Time
 Singapore Tiger Standard, a defunct English language newspaper in Singapore
 Standard Singapore English, see Singapore English